The Old Mission Dam is a historic water impoundment structure in Mission Trails Regional Park in San Diego, California.  It was built about 1803 to impound the San Diego River to provide water for irrigation of the fields associated with the Mission San Diego de Alcalá, the first Spanish mission in what is now The State of California.  It was the first major colonial-era irrigation project on the Pacific coast of the United States.  The surviving remnant of the dam was designated a National Historic Landmark in 1963.

Description and history
It spans the San Diego River, which was historically a seasonal body of water which dried out in the summer. The dam created a body of water behind it, which would undergo controlled releases when the river otherwise ran dry. A tile channel to the mission fields was also built, in order to minimize water loss in the sandy soil, but only fragments of this work still survive.

Mission San Diego de Alcalá was founded in 1769 by Father Junipero Serra, and was moved to its present surviving site in 1774.  By 1800, the mission was a thriving community with 1,500 Christianized Native Americans.  The mission suffered three years of drought in 1800-1802, which likely prompted construction of the irrigation project.  The works probably reached their greatest extent in 1817, including the tiled aqueduct and other features lost to time and vandalism.  The dam and aqueduct were reported to be in ruins in 1867, but the dam was repaired in 1874 and again put to use for a time.

The dam is now part of Mission Trails Regional Park, the largest municipal park in California. Old Mission Dam is also a registered state historic landmark.

See also
National Register of Historic Places listings in San Diego County, California
List of National Historic Landmarks in California

References

Dams in California
San Diego River
Buildings and structures in San Diego
Dams completed in 1803
National Historic Landmarks in California
National Register of Historic Places in San Diego
1803 in Alta California
1803 establishments in Alta California